The David E. Rumelhart Prize for Contributions to the Theoretical Foundations of Human Cognition was founded in 2001 in honor of the cognitive scientist David Rumelhart to introduce the equivalent of a Nobel prize for cognitive science. It is awarded annually to "an individual or collaborative team making a significant contemporary contribution to the theoretical foundations of human cognition". The annual award is presented at the Cognitive Science Society meeting, where the recipient gives a lecture and receives a check for $100,000. At the conclusion of the ceremony, the next year's award winner is announced. The award is funded by the Robert J. Glushko and Pamela Samuelson Foundation.

The Rumelhart Prize committee is independent of the Cognitive Science Society. However, the society provides a large and interested audience for the awards.

Selection Committee 
As of 2022, the selection committee for the prize consisted of:
Richard Cooper (chair)
Dedre Gentner
Robert J. Glushko
Tania Lombrozo
Steven T. Piantadosi
Jesse Snedeker

Recipients

See also 

 List of psychology awards
 List of computer science awards
 List of social sciences awards
 List of prizes known as the Nobel of a field
 List of awards named after people
 Turing Award
 The Brain Prize

References

Awards established in 2001
Cognitive science awards